Alrausuchus is an extinct genus of biarmosuchian therapsids from Russia. It was named by M.F. Ivakhnenko in 2008, as a reclassification of the species Biarmosuchus tagax that Ivachnenko had named in 1990. Ivachnenko erected the monotypic family Alrausuchidae for the genus.

References

Biarmosuchians
Prehistoric therapsid genera
Permian Russia
Fossils of Russia
Fossil taxa described in 2008